Zimnowoda  is a village in the administrative district of Gmina Lipie, within Kłobuck County, Silesian Voivodeship, in southern Poland.

The village has a population of 565.

During the German invasion of Poland, which started World War II, on September 2, 1939, the Germans carried out a massacre of 38 Polish inhabitants, including 10 children (see Nazi crimes against the Polish nation).

References

Zimnowoda
Massacres of Poles
Nazi war crimes in Poland